Gleam  may refer to:

Music
Gleam (album), by Freddie Hubbard, 1975
The Gleam (album), a 1987 album by Steve Lacy
The Gleam (EP), a 2006 EP by the Avett Brothers
 "Gleam" (single), a 2019 single by Mamamoo; see Mamamoo discography
 "The Gleam" (song), a 1987 song by Steve Lacy off the eponymous album The Gleam
 "Gleam" (song), a 2019 song by Moonbyul off Mamamoo

Other uses
"The Gleam", a 1942 comic strip story that first gave the full name of Minnie Mouse
Global LGBTQI+ Employee & Allies at Microsoft
Samsung Gleam, or Samsung SCH-U700, a mobile phone
A Gleam (foaled 1949), an American Thoroughbred racehorse
A Gleam Invitational Handicap (1979-2013), a U.S. horserace
Gleam (US-11), a 12m yacht; see List of 12-metre yachts
 GLEAM (Galactic and Extragalactic All-sky Murchison Widefield Array Survey), an astronomical survey at the International Centre for Radio Astronomy Research

See also

Advertiser-Gleam, a newspaper in Guntersville, Alabama, US
The Arizona Gleam, a newspaper in Arizona, US; see List of newspapers in Arizona
 
Gleem, a toothpaste brand